Curacha, also known as "spanner crab" or "red frog crab", is a local Chavacano name given to Ranina ranina, commonly found in the waters of Sulu province and Zamboanga and Bataan province. It is a large crab with a red color, which stays the same in color even when cooked. The crab is usually steamed or boiled so its flavor is preserved. Unlike most crabs whose majority of meat can be found in their claws, most of the meat in curacha is found in its body.

The word curacha is Chavacano for "cockroach", in reference to its appearance, derived from Spanish cucaracha. It also is known as kagang pamah in Tausug and ipis dagat ("sea cockroach") in Bataeño Tagalog.

See also
Ginataang hipon
Curacha Alavar
Halabos

References

Philippine cuisine
Culture of Zamboanga City